Vinifera  may refer to:
 Vinifera, Victoria, a locality in Australia
 759 Vinifera, a minor planet orbiting the sun
 Vitis vinifera, the common grape vine